"Tattoo" is a poem from Wallace Stevens's first book of poetry, Harmonium. It was originally published in 1916, so it is in the public domain. Librivox has made the poem available in voice recording in its The Complete Public Domain Poems of Wallace Stevens.

Interpretation

Buttel detects Imagistic technique in the poem's Whitman-like naming of physical details. In response to nature,  man's natural architecture of flesh and bones has developed so as to catch nature's beauty. We are tattoo'd by it, but equally we tattoo nature with human sensibility.

Notes

References 

 Buttel, Robert. Wallace Stevens: The Making of Harmonium. 1967: Princeton University Press.

External  links
The Complete Public Domain Poems of Wallace Stevens

1916 poems
American poems
Poetry by Wallace Stevens